( is a county of Sichuan Province, China. It is under the administration of Yibin City.

Administrative divisions

Longtou

Climate

References

Counties and districts of Yibin